,Sherbrooke Lake may refer to:

 Sherbrooke Lake (British Columbia) in British Columbia, Canada
 Sherbrooke Lake (Nova Scotia) in Nova Scotia, Canada
 Sherbrooke Lake (Lunenburg) in Nova Scotia, Canada